The Landray GL.01 is a small tandem-wing, side-by-side seat sport aircraft of the Mignet Pou-du-Ciel type. Built in the mid 1970s, the single example remains active.

Design and development
In the later 1970s Gilbert Landray began to build the first of a series of tandem-wing light aircraft in the Mignet Pou-du-Ciel tradition and closest to the Croses Criquet in implementation. Like the Criquet the GL.01 is a two-seat tractor configuration aircraft with side-by-side seating.

The forward wing of the GL.01 is a one piece structure, mounted so that its angle of incidence can be varied from 2° to 14° by the pilot.  The wing is held above the fuselage on two tall and slightly diverging faired struts, with pivots at their tops.  Two further pivots are placed at the ends of lighter struts further out on the wing.  Two vertical links from the cockpit to the rear of the wing are connected to the control column.  The fixed rear wing is fabric covered and fitted with two metal flaps. Yaw stability and control are provided by a small fin and large, deep, balanced rudder, both entirely wooden and angular. Unusually, the rudder balance surface is below the fuselage.

The GL.01 has a wooden fuselage with seats enclosed under a perspex canopy.  It is powered by a  Continental C90-8F flat four engine, driving a two blade propeller. It has a fixed tailwheel undercarriage, with spatted main wheels on arched, glass fibre, cantilever legs and a tailwheel semi-recessed into the bottom of the rudder.

The GL.01 made its first flight in August 1976. It remains on the French civil aircraft register in 2014, having been based at Marennes since 2003.

Specifications

References

External links
NACA 23012 airfoil 

Homebuilt aircraft
Tandem-wing aircraft
1970s French sport aircraft
Aircraft first flown in 1976